Bernhard Gstrein (born 19 September 1965) is a former alpine skier from Austria. Born in Vent, he competed from 1984 to 1996 and won one World Cup slalom competition. At the 1988 Winter Olympics, he won a silver medal in the men's alpine combined.

References

Sports Reference

1965 births
Austrian male alpine skiers
Olympic alpine skiers of Austria
Olympic silver medalists for Austria
Alpine skiers at the 1988 Winter Olympics
Alpine skiers at the 1992 Winter Olympics
Alpine skiers at the 1994 Winter Olympics
Living people
Olympic medalists in alpine skiing

Medalists at the 1988 Winter Olympics